Patna Training College is a Bachelor of Education college situated in Patna, Bihar, India. It was established in 1908. The college, under Patna University, is approved by the National Council for Teacher Education and the University Grants Commission.

See also
 List of teacher education schools in India

References

External links
Patna Training College

Colleges affiliated to Patna University
Colleges of education in India
Universities and colleges in Patna
Educational institutions established in 1908
1908 establishments in India